Kumrovec is a village in the northern part Croatia, part of Krapina-Zagorje County. It sits on the Sutla River, along the Croatian-Slovenian border. The Kumrovec municipality has 1,413 residents (2021), but the village itself has only 267 people. The municipality was established on May 6, 1997, after it was split from the municipality of Tuhelj.

Kumrovec is notably the birthplace of marshal Josip Broz Tito (1892–1980), the president of Yugoslavia. The birth house of Tito (built in 1860 as the first brickwork house in the village) features the Memorial Museum of Marshal Tito, opened in 1953. The museum is also important for the local folklore. Next to the house is the bronze standing statue of Marshal Tito (made by Antun Augustinčić, 1948). The old part of Kumrovec comprises the Ethnological Museum with 18 village houses, displaying permanent exhibitions of artifacts related to the life and work of Zagorje peasants in the 19th/20th century.
The village is small but of great popularity in the former Yugoslavia, owing to the annual celebration of Youth Day every May 25.

Today the major attraction of Kumrovec is the Ethnological Museum Staro Selo (Old Village) Kumrovec with very well preserved village houses from the turn of 19th/20th century. The reconstruction and redecoration of these houses started in 1977. So far 40-odd houses and other farmstead facilities have been restored, which makes Staro Selo the most attractive place of this kind in Croatia. Visitors may see permanent ethnological exhibitions such as the Zagorje-style Wedding, the Life of Newly-weds, From Hemp to Linen, Blacksmith's Crafts, Cart-wright's Craft, Pottery, From Grain to Bread, etc.

On November 24, 1935, the Brethren of the Croatian Dragon raised a monument to the Croatian anthem Lijepa naša domovino to celebrate its one hundredth anniversary. Kumrovec celebrates this day as its municipal holiday.

History
In the late 19th and early 20th century, Kumrovec was part of Varaždin County of the Kingdom of Croatia-Slavonia.

Culture
The municipality is home to the cultural organization KUD Kumrovec. It has two Catholic chapels: Kapela sv. Rok built in 1963 and Kapela Majke Božje Snježne built in 1639.

Population
According to the 2011 census, the municipality had a total population of 1,588 in ten separate settlements:
 Donji Škrnik (pop. 169)
 Dugnjevec (pop. 67)
 Kladnik (pop. 155)
 Kumrovec (pop. 267)
 Podgora (pop. 45)
 Ravno Brezje (pop. 216)
 Razdrto Tuheljsko (pop. 97)
 Razvor (pop. 191)
 Risvica (pop. 277)
 Velinci (pop. 104)

Gallery

References

External links

 Official site

Populated places in Krapina-Zagorje County
Municipalities of Croatia
Tourist attractions in Krapina-Zagorje County
Josip Broz Tito